Rafoxanide is a salicylanilide used as an anthelmintic. It is most commonly used in ruminant animals to treat adult liver flukes of the species Fasciola hepatica and Fasciola gigantica.

References

Anthelmintics
Benzamides
Chloroarenes
Iodoarenes
Phenols
Salicylanilides
Veterinary drugs